Soul Sista is the debut studio album by American R&B singer KeKe Wyatt. It was released on November 13, 2001, by MCA Records. The album's writing and production was entirely credited to Steve Huff. The album debuted at number 33 on the US Billboard 200. The album has been certified gold by the Recording Industry Association of America (RIAA) for shipments of 500,000 copies within the United States.

Music videos
The music video for her third single, "I Don't Wanna", features her former spouse, Rahmat Morton, playing her husband.

Promotion
Wyatt promoted the album extensively by performing promotional concerts within the United States. In October 2001, she launched the KeKe Wyatt: Live Tour, which went on to do 50 shows throughout the United States and United Kingdom, ending in July 2002. After the tour, Wyatt continued the promotion by appearing on several talk shows and red carpets.

Track listing

Charts

Weekly charts

Year-end charts

References

External links 
 MCA site

2001 debut albums
Keke Wyatt albums
MCA Records albums